Spin the bottle is a kissing party game commonly played by teenagers. The game was very popular among teenagers during the second half of the 20th century because it fostered "sexual" interactions between boys and girls. It has even been described as "the party game of choice for glandularly excited high schoolers". It has been described as a coming-of-age party game.

Even though the game might be played occasionally by young teenagers or young adults, its popularity has declined since the 1980s.

The game
The game is played by several players who sit, stand, or kneel in a circle. A bottle (typically an empty glass soda or beer bottle) is placed on the floor in the center of the circle. A player spins the bottle, and must kiss the person to whom the bottle points when it stops spinning. Alternatively, the person to whom the bottle is pointing must kiss the person at the rear end of the bottle.

There are a very large number of variants. One variant is that instead, two players must hug within five seconds, otherwise, they have to kiss in 10 seconds and if the 10 seconds are up and they have not kissed, then they have to French kiss. Variations allow for other tasks to be accomplished. It can also be used to decide the players for other games, such as truth or dare or seven minutes in heaven. Variations may also include penalties, such as removing a piece of clothing.

History
Written records of bottle-spinning games date back to the 1920s, though early accounts make no mention of kissing. 
Written records of a similar game, called Bottle of Fortune, are available dating back to 1927.

See also

 Seven minutes in heaven
 Truth or dare?

References

Kissing games
Party games